Mike Pollio (born May 12, 1943) is an American former basketball coach and college athletics administrator.  He was the head men's basketball coach at Kentucky Wesleyan College from 1980 to 1985, Virginia Commonwealth University (VCU) from 1985 to 1989, and Eastern Kentucky University from 1989 to 1992, compiling a career college basketball coaching record of 233–105.  At Kentucky Wesleyan, he also served as athletic director, reviving the Kentucky Wesleyan Panthers football program in 1983 after a 53-year hiatus.  From 2002 until June 2010, he was the commissioner of the Mid-South Conference. Pollio is a graduate of Bellarmine College.

Head coaching record

References

1943 births
Living people
American men's basketball coaches
Bellarmine University alumni
Eastern Kentucky Colonels men's basketball coaches
Kentucky Wesleyan Panthers athletic directors
Kentucky Wesleyan Panthers men's basketball coaches
Mid-South Conference commissioners
Old Dominion Monarchs men's basketball coaches
VCU Rams men's basketball coaches